Psí vojáci (lit. Dog Soldiers) was a Czech rock band from Prague, fronted by singer, pianist and songwriter Filip Topol, son of playwright Josef Topol and brother of writer Jáchym Topol. Topol formed the band in 1979 with drummer David Skála and bassist Jan Hazuka, his elementary school classmates. It disbanded in August 2011, then reformed in October 2012 with the original line-up and finally ceased to exist in June 2013 with Topol's death. The band was named after the Dog Soldiers, a Cheyenne military society that appeared in Thomas Berger’s novel Little Big Man. They were a part of the Prague underground countercultural movement, and were influenced by punk rock as well as avant-garde and classical music including composers of the second half of the 18th century. Topol also performed solo on the piano and played songs from his solo albums, often with confessional lyrics.

History 
Psí vojáci first performed publicly in 1979 at the IX. Prague Jazz Days and they soon drew attention of the secret police. At the time, the band members were 13 years old. When Filip Topol was questioned by police for the first time, he was not even fifteen years old. The band was not allowed to perform publicly and it only played at private underground events (e.g. at Václav Havel’s cottage in Hrádeček). In the course of several years the band repeatedly changed style as well as members. At first, Filip’s brother Jáchym cooperated in song writing for the band. Later on, Filip started writing lyrics himself. In late 1980s the band started to perform under a pseudonym P.V.O. (Dog Soldiers in Person) and the Prague Junior Club Na Chmelnici became their home stage.

After 1989 Psí vojáci became popular concert performers and they started playing at many clubs as well as music festivals. They toured clubs in Hungary, Austria, Germany and Netherlands and they performed at music festivals in Belgium and France. Their songs were used in films (e.g. Žiletky by the director Zdeněk Tyc, where Filip Topol played the main role) and they also participated in creating scenic music for several theatre plays.

.

Members 
Filip Topol – vocals, piano (1979–2011, 2012–2013)
David Skála – drums (1979–?, 2012–2013)
Jan Hazuka – bass guitar (1979–?, 2012–2013)
Vít Krůta – guitar (1980–81)

Discography

Studio albums 
 P.V.O. (Rock debut 6) (Panton, 1989)
 Nalej čistého vína, pokrytče (Globus International, 1991)
 Leitmotiv (Globus International, 1991)
 Baroko v Čechách (Black Point, 1993)
 Sestra (Indies Records, 1994)
 Brutální lyrika (Indies Records, 1995)
 Sakramiláčku (Indies Records, 1995)
 Hořící holubi (Indies Records, 1997)
 Myši v poli a jiné příběhy (Indies Records, 1999)
 Studio 1983-85 (Black Point, 2000)
 U sousedů vyje pes (Indies Records, 2001)
 Slečna Kristýna (Indies Records, 2002)
 Těžko říct (Indies Records, 2003)

Live albums 
 Vol. 1 a Vol. 2 (Black Point, 1990)
 1979/80 Live (Black Point, 1991)
 Live I. a Live II. (Gang Records, 1993)
 Nechoď sama do tmy (Black Point, 1995; Recorded in January 1987 in Junior klub)
 Mučivé vzpomínky (Black Point, 1997)
 Psi a vojáci (Black Point, 2000)

Compilation albums 
 Národ Psích vojáků (Indies Records, 1996)

Single 
 Žiletky (1994)

Literature 
 Národ Psích vojáků (Maťa, 1999)
 Jirsa, Tomáš. Charting Post-Underground Nostalgia: Anachronistic Practices of the Post-Velvet Revolution Rock Scene. Iluminace, vol. 29, no. 3, 2017, pp. 65-86.

External links 
 

Czech underground music groups
Czech experimental rock groups
Czech alternative rock groups
Czech art rock groups
Czech experimental music groups
Czech punk rock groups
Czechoslovak rock music groups
Musical groups from Prague
1979 establishments in Czechoslovakia
2010s disestablishments in the Czech Republic
Musical groups established in 1979
Musical groups disestablished in 2011
Musical groups reestablished in 2012
Musical groups disestablished in 2013
Musical trios